Byron McLean Rankin, Jr., nicknamed "Mack," was a prominent member in the Texas oil industry who became a part-owner of the Texas Rangers.

Personal life
Rankin was born in Mineola, Texas on January 8, 1930. He initially attended Kilgore Junior College before transferring to the University of Texas earning a BBA in Accounting.

Mack attended the University of Texas at Austin, earning a BBA in Accounting. He then proudly spent four years serving as a First Lieutenant, and eventually an Officer of Procurement in the United States Army during the implementation of The Marshall Plan while stationed in Germany after WWII. Mack was especially proud of his years in the service. He remained politically active his entire career, later becoming an aggressive advocate for effective governing of oil industry regulations.

Rankin entered the oil business working for an oilfield company in Post, Texas. From 1955 to 1967, he worked for Hunt Oil Company before joining geologists Jim Bob Moffett and Kent McWilliams to form McMoRan Oil Company and McMoRan Exploration Company. He served as president of the oil and gas company from 1968 to 1975 and as chairman of the executive committee and co-chairman of the board of the exploration firm from 1975 to 1977.

Rankin was a private pilot and an avid golfer. Rankin was a member of at least a dozen clubs, including Brook Hollow, and was a director at Preston Trail and Pine Valley golf clubs.

Because of his diagnosis and ongoing treatment for Chronic Lymphocytic Leukemia, Mr. Rankin retired from active management in 1977, and continued to serve in the capacities of Vice Chairman of the Board and Consultant to the Company, and Member of the Board of Directors, Executive Committee and major shareholder until his passing.

He died on August 14, 2013 at the age of 83, in Dallas, Texas and was buried there in the Sparkman-Hillcrest Memorial Park Cemetery.

Oil endeavors
He learned the ins and outs of the oil business under expert tutelage at Hunt Oil Company, before teaming up with Jim Bob Moffett and the late W.K. McWilliams, Jr. (Kent), to form McMoRan Oil, Inc. & McMoRan Exploration Company. In 1969, the company went public through exchange of stock with Horn Silver Mines and name changed to McMoRan Oil & Gas Company, a Delaware corporation, and listed on the New York Stock Exchange in 1978. Rankin, from 1968 to 1975 held the position of President. From 1975 to 1977, he served as Co-Chairman of the Board and Chairman of the Executive Committee. The team later merged with Freeport Minerals to become Freeport-McMoRan, while keeping McMoRan Exploration as a subsidiary company, and became the largest phosphate fertilizer and sulfur producer in the United States. Subsequently, in 1995, the company spun off Freeport-McMoRan Copper & Gold, Inc., which, in Indonesia, mines the largest known gold deposit in the world and the third largest Copper reserve, with over 15,000 employees.

In 2007, Freeport-McMoRan Copper & Gold bought Phelps Dodge, becoming the largest publicly traded Copper producer in the world, largest Molybdenum producer in the world and a major Cobalt and Gold Producer with 38,000 employees.

His directorships in business included seats on the boards of Freeport-McMoRan Copper and Gold Inc., McMoRan Exploration Inc., and P.T. Freeport Indonesia. He sat also as Chairman of the U.S. Oil & Gas Association. He was an active member of the Dallas Wildcat Committee, the Dallas Petroleum Club, the Texas Oil & Gas Association, and member of the All-American Wildcatters, where his annual roasts as The Big Gusher were highly anticipated.

Other endeavors
Rankin purchased a stake in the Texas Rangers in the early 1980s, becoming a minority owner and sitting on the team's six-man board of directors. He sold his share of the team to majority owner Eddie Chiles in October 1982.

In 2012, he commissioned Canadian biographer Rachel Landry to write his memoirs. The manuscript, entitled Recollections of a Badass, was completed a few months before he died in 2013 and remains unpublished.

Philanthropy
He was a well-known University of Texas booster.  He is recognized for his many endowments including the B.M. Rankin (Mack) Rankin, Jr. Professorship in Business Administration, the Athletic Department Scholarship, and the Head Football Coach Endowment. Equally passionate about the opportunities of college sports, he was asked to lead the fundraising campaign for the expansion of the Darrell K. Royal Texas Memorial Stadium. His efforts were immensely successful. He is a lifetime trustee of the Sigma Phi Epsilon fraternity Foundation and past National Director of the same fraternity.

Mr. Rankin's name prominently hangs over the entrance to the Longhorn Dining Hall, which he partly funded. He also endowed scholarships at Jesuit College Preparatory School, which his son Richard attended. Mack was recognized as an Outstanding Alumnus at both Gladewater High School and the University of Texas, where he was also inducted into the McCombs School of Business Hall of Fame.

Mr. Rankin was the proud Co-Founder and Chairman of the Chronic Lymphocytic Leukemia Global Research Foundation, now nationally recognized by M.D. Anderson's inclusion in their far-reaching Moon Shots Research Program, one of only six departments of the Cancer Center so recognized.  He served as an example of the successful advancements in cancer treatments, also known as one of the longest surviving patients in M.D. Anderson history.

References

2013 deaths
Texas Rangers owners
1930 births
People from Mineola, Texas